Vamsee Krishna (born 15 September 1982) is an Indian film screenwriter, dialogue writer, and director known for his works exclusively in Telugu cinema.

In the year 2015, his debut directorial Dongaata.

Filmography

References

External links 

 
 

Living people
21st-century Indian male writers
1993 births